Çumra is a town and district of Konya Province in the Central Anatolia region of Turkey. According to 2000 census, population of the district is 104,576 of which 42,308 live in the town of Çumra.

Çumra town
It is an important stop on the Istanbul to Baghdad railway. It is central to the 500 km²/120,000 acre Çumra irrigation zone, in the Konya Plain, that was established in 1912.

History
Neolithic (c. 8000 BC) archaeological discoveries have been found at Çatalhöyük.

In the 12th century the Konya plain experienced its second great cultural period, when the city became the capital of the Seljuk Turks.

Archaeological findings 
In 2019, a farmer near the site of Türkmen-Karahöyük, a Bronze and Iron Age mounded settlement discovered a stone stele commissioned by Hartapu to commemorate his victory over Phrygia written in Luwian Hieroglyphics. Archaeologists from the University of Chicago joined the Konya Regional Archaeological Survey Project to excavate the stele, and the excavations of the archaeological mound at the site, which is believed to be the capital of Hartapu's as yet unnamed kingdom, will continue in 2020. In February 2020, archaeologists announced the discovery of Luwian hieroglyphs on the stone stele pulled out of the irrigation ditch next to the ancient mound of Türkmen-Karahöyük, describing the military victory of "Great King Hartapu" over an alliance of 13 kings. The description has a reference to defeating the royal house of Phrygia, which included King Midas.

Notes

References

External links
 District governor's official website 
 District municipality's official website 

 
Populated places in Konya Province
Districts of Konya Province